Riverside Museum may refer to:

Riverside Museum, part of the Glasgow Museum of Transport, in Glasgow, Scotland.
Riverside Museum, contemporary art museum in New York City open from 1938-1971
Any of several museums in Riverside, California, United States:
Riverside Art Museum
Museum of Riverside
List of museums in Riverside, California